Ian Monk (born 1960) is a British writer and translator, based in Paris, France.

Biography
Since 1998, he has been a member of the French writing group Oulipo. Among his works in English are the books, Family Archaeology and Other Poems (2004) and Writings for the Oulipo (2005).  His translations include several novels by Daniel Pennac, several works by his fellow Oulipian Georges Perec, and a rhymed translation of Raymond Roussel's New Impressions of Africa (Nouvelles Impressions d'Afrique). He now writes mainly in French, but in 2015 published a bilingual, self-translated (in both directions) ebook of poetry, Les feuilles de yucca / Leaves of the Yucca (Contre-mur). He won the Scott Moncrieff Prize in 2004 for his translation of Monsieur Malaussène by Daniel Pennac.

Original works 
 Interludes (translated by Philip Terry), Ma Bibliothèque, 2020
 PQR, éditions isabelle sauvage, 2021
 Aujourd'hui le soleil, Les Venterniers, 2019
 Vers de l'infini, Cambourakis, 2017
 Ça coule et ça crache, poèmes sur les photos de Hervé Van De Meulebroeke, Les Venterniers, 2016
 Twin Towers, 3D poem, les mille univers, 2015
 Les feuilles de yucca / Leaves of the Yucca, bilingual ebook, Contre-mur, 2015
 Là, Cambourakis, 2014
14 x 14, L'Âne qui butine, 2013
La Jeunesse de Mek-Ouyes, Cambourakis, 2010
Plouk Town, Cambourakis, 2007
 Stoned at Bourges, les mille univers, 2006
 Writings for the Oulipo, Make Now, 2005
 N/S, Éditions de l'attente, 2004 (with Frédéric Forte)
 L'Inconnu du Sambre express, TEC-CRIAC, 2004
 Family Archaeology and Other Poems, Make now, 2004
 Le Voyage d'Ovide, le Verger éd., 2002
 Le Désesperanto, Plurielle, 2001

In collaboration :
 Battre les rues, in Les Mystères de la capitale, (with Olivier Salon), Le bec en l'air, 2013
 Septines en Septaine et autres poèmes, (with Frédéric Forte et al), Les mille univers, 2013
 Anthologie de l’Oulipo, Gallimard, 2009.
 À chacun sa place, La Contre Allée, 2008
 Potje vleesch, La Nuit Myrtide, 2006
 Oulipo Compendium, Atlas Press, 1998

Publications in the Bibliothèque oulipienne :
 "Canzone", La Bibliothèque oulipienne, n° 222, 2015
 Le Monde des nonines, (with Michèle Audin) La Bibliothèque oulipienne, n° 218, 2015
 Comment dire en anglais, La Bibliothèque oulipienne, n° 188, 2010
 La Queninisation du yucca, La Bibliothèque oulipienne, n° 181, 2009
 Les Feuilles du yucca, La Bibliothèque oulipienne, n° 176, 2008
 Élémentaire, mon cher, La Bibliothèque oulipienne, n° 128, 2003
 Quenoums, La Bibliothèque oulipienne, n° 127, 2003
 Les États du sonnet, La Bibliothèque oulipienne, n° 116, 2001
 Le Voyage d'Hoover, La Bibliothèque oulipienne, n° 110, 1999
 Monquines, La Bibliothèque oulipienne, n° 109, 1999
 Fractales, La Bibliothèque oulipienne, n° 102, 1999

Editor / translator (with Daniel Levin Becker)

All That is Evident is Suspect : Readings from the Oulipo 1963-2018, McSweeney's, 2018

Selected Translations 
 Frédéric Forte : Minute Operas (Operas Minute), en collaboration, Burning Deck, 2014
 Georges Perec / Oulipo: Winter Journeys (Le Voyage d'hiver & ses suites), Atlas Press, 2013
 Jacques Roubaud: Mathematics: (Mathématique:) Dalkey Archive, 2012
 Hervé Le Tellier: A Thousand Thoughts (Les amnésiques n'ont rien vécu d'inoubliable), Dalkey Archive, 2011
 Yannick Haenel: The Messenger (Jan Karski), Text Publishing Company, 2010
 Raymond Roussel: New Impressions of Africa (Nouvelles impressions d'Afrique), Atlas Press, 2005
 Marie Darrieussecq: White (White), Faber, 2005
 Marie Darrieussecq: A Brief Stay with the Living (Bref séjour chez les vivants), Faber, 2005
 Camille Laurens: In Those Arms (Dans ces bras-là), Bloomsbury, 2005
 Daniel Pennac: Monsieur Malaussène (Monsieur Malaussène), Harvill, 2003
 Mathieu Ricard / Trinh X. Thuan: The Quantum and the Lotus (L'Univers dans la paume de la main), Random House, 2001
 François Caradec: Raymond Roussel: A Life (Raymond Roussel), Atlas, 2001
 Daniel Pennac: Passion Fruit (Aux fruits de la passion), Harvill, 2000
 Daniel Pennac; Write to Kill (La Petite Marchande de prose), Harvill, 1999
 Daniel Pennac: The Scapegoat (Au bonheur des ogres), Harvill, 1998
 Daniel Pennac: The Fairy Gunmother (La Fée carabine), Harvill, 1997
 Georges Perec: Three (Quel petit vélo...?, Les Revenentes & Un cabinet d'amateur), Harvill, 1998

References

External links 
 Some of Ian Monk's works online
 Ian Monk's page on the official Oulipo site (in French)
 Ian Monk reads Twin Towers in New York
 Ian Monk & The Outsiders Based on Ian Monk's texts, a rock adaptation and more...

French–English translators
British writers
Oulipo members
Writers from London
1960 births
Living people
French male writers